The 1991 Roller Hockey World Cup was the thirtieth roller hockey world cup, organized by the Fédération Internationale de Roller Sports. It was contested by 12 national teams (6 from Europe, 3 from South America, 1 from North America, 1 from Africa and 1 from Oceania). The group A was played in the city of Braga and all the other games were played in Porto, in the north of Portugal, the chosen city to host the World Cup.

Portugal won his 13th title, defeating surprise finalists, the Netherlands, by 7-0, in the final. It was the first title for Portugal since 1982. Because of its importance, the final was attended by the Portuguese President, Mário Soares.

Group stage

Group A

 All the games played in Braga

Group B

Final phase

9th to 12th play-off

Final round

Standings

See also
 FIRS Roller Hockey World Cup

External links
 1991 World Cup in rink-hockey.net historical database

Roller Hockey World Cup
International roller hockey competitions hosted by Portugal
1991 in roller hockey
1991 in Portuguese sport